"Nobody Else but Me", sometimes called "Nobody Else but You", is a 1946 song composed by Jerome Kern with lyrics by Oscar Hammerstein II for the 1946 Broadway revival of the musical Show Boat when it was introduced by Jan Clayton as the character Magnolia. This was the last song written by Kern; he died shortly before the 1946 production opened.

Vocal recordings
 1946 Jan Clayton in the Show Boat cast album.
 1957  Barbara Lea – for her album Barbara Lea With the Johnny Windhurst Quartet.
 1959 Mitzi Gaynor – for her album Mitzi
 1959 Peggy King – for her album Lazy Afternoon
 1961 Ruth Price – for her album Ruth Price with Shelly Manne & His Men at the Manne-Hole.
 1963 Sarah Vaughan – for her album The Explosive Side of Sarah Vaughan.
 1964 Tony Bennett – included in his album When Lights Are Low.
 1965 Dinah Shore – for her album Lower Basin Street Revisited.
 1995 Mel Tormé – for the album Velvet & Brass.
 2001 Kristin Chenoweth – for her album Let Yourself Go.
 2003 Tina May – for her album I'll Take Romance
 2007 Annette Sanders with Bob Florence – for their album You Will Be My Music.
 2015 Tony Bennett – for the album The Silver Lining: The Songs of Jerome Kern.

Instrumental recordings
 1964 Stan Getz – included on his album Nobody Else but Me, first released in 1994. 
 1967 Joe Pass – included on his album Simplicity.
 1976 Bill Evans – recorded during sessions for his album Quintessence, and first released as a bonus track on compact disc reissues of the album.
 1977 Bill Evans – recorded for his album I Will Say Goodbye, which was first released in 1980.
 1978 Bill Evans – recorded for his album New Conversations, this was the last recorded studio version of the song by Evans, but the first to be released.
 1984 Ed Bickert – recorded for his album Bye Bye Baby.
 1997 Brad Mehldau – recorded for his album The Art of the Trio Volume One.
 2018 Walter Smith III – recorded for his album Twio.

References

External links
Chords for "Nobody Else but Me"

1946 songs
1940s jazz standards
Swing jazz standards